In renal physiology, reabsorption or tubular reabsorption is the process by which the nephron removes water and solutes from the tubular fluid (pre-urine) and returns them to the circulating blood. It is called reabsorption (and not absorption) because these substances have already been absorbed once (particularly in the intestines) and the body is reclaiming them from a postglomerular fluid stream that is on its way to becoming urine (that is, they will soon be lost to the urine unless they are reabsorbed from the tubule into the  peritubular capillaries. This happens as a result of sodium transport from the lumen into the blood by the Na+/K+ATPase in the basolateral membrane of the epithelial cells. Thus, the glomerular filtrate becomes more concentrated, which is one of the steps in forming urine.    Nephrons are divided into five segments, with different segments responsible for reabsorbing different substances.  Reabsorption allows many useful solutes (primarily glucose and amino acids), salts and water that have passed through Bowman's capsule, to return to the circulation. These solutes are reabsorbed isotonically, in that the osmotic potential of the fluid leaving the proximal convoluted tubule is the same as that of the initial glomerular filtrate. However, glucose, amino acids, inorganic phosphate, and some other solutes are reabsorbed via secondary active transport through cotransport channels driven by the sodium gradient.

Renin–angiotensin system:
 The kidneys sense low blood pressure.
 Release renin into the blood.
 Renin causes production of angiotensin I.
 Angiotensin-converting enzyme (ACE) converts angiotensin I to angiotensin II.
 Angiotensin II stimulates the release of aldosterone, ADH, and thirst.
 Aldosterone causes kidneys to reabsorb sodium; ADH increases the uptake of water.
 Water follows sodium.
 As blood volume increases, pressure also increases.

See also
Transepithelial potential difference driving reabsorption

References

Renal physiology